The Schirmer Inheritance is a 1953 novel by Eric Ambler. It was adapted for television in 1957 by ITV.

Plot
George Carey is a former WWII bomber pilot and recently qualified lawyer. In 1951 or 1952, Carey is tasked with going through the Schneider Johnson files, to check that nothing has been overlooked in the search for the heir to the Schirmer fortune.

References

English thriller novels
British thriller novels
Novels by Eric Ambler
1953 British novels
Novels set in Paris
Novels set in Germany
Novels set in Greece
Novels set in Yugoslavia
Novels set in the 1800s
Heinemann (publisher) books